Kisha can refer to:

Kisha clubs, journalists' cartels in Japan
Kisha Ford, former WNBA player
Kisha Snow, U.S. boxer
Kisha (river), in Adygea, Russia
, Swiss singer
 Kisha Seizo, a former Japanese rolling stock company